West Hardin County Consolidated Independent School District is a public school district based in the community of Saratoga, Texas, USA.

In addition to Saratoga, the district serves the cities of Batson , Thicket, and Votaw, as well as the unincorporated communities of Hoop and Holler and Outlaw Bend.

In 2009, the school district was rated "academically acceptable" by the Texas Education Agency.

Schools
West Hardin Secondary (Grades 7-12)
West Hardin Elementary (Grades PK-6)

References

External links

School districts in Hardin County, Texas